Laclede, LaClede or La Clede may refer:

Pierre Laclède, founder of St. Louis, Missouri
Laclede's Landing, St. Louis
LaClede Town in St. Louis
LaClede Township, Fayette County, Illinois
La Clede, Illinois
Laclede, Missouri, a small city
Laclede County, Missouri
The Laclede Group, public utility holding company
Laclede Gas Company, its primary subsidiary
 Laclede, Idaho